"Workin' Together" is a song written by Ike Turner (credited to Eki Renrut, his name spelled backwards) and released by Ike & Tina Turner in 1970 as the lead single from their most successful studio album Workin' Together.

Composition and release 
"Workin' Together" is a mid-tempo song powered by Tina's soulful chorus and Ike on guitar. The subject of the song is unusual for the duo because it's political, detailing the problems of the world. The single was released in October 1970, reaching No. 41 on the Billboard Soul Singles chart and No. 105 on Bubbling Under The Hot 100. Ike and Tina  promoted the single with a music video which contains live performances, candid footage of the duo, and clips about violence, racism and war. The video was shown on American Bandstand in January 1971.

Critical reception 
Billboard (October 24, 1970): "Title tune of their current LP, the dynamic duo hit hard with this driving rock item with strong lyric line. A sure-fire chart topper for their recent 'I Want to take You Higher.'"
Cash Box (October 24, 1970): "Let's try a little love for a change," wails Tina with such sheer power and liquid grace that it turns this plea for interracial peace into a total Super-smash! Creeping concert and electric pianos herald the advent of Tina's clawing heart -felt vocals. And then Ike's strong vital arrangement sweeps the song headlong towards a series of climaxes. Little doubt that this will find heavy airplay and sales in both top forty and r&b circles. It's dead on target.

Track listing

Chart performance

References 

1970 songs
1970 singles
Ike & Tina Turner songs
Songs written by Ike Turner
Song recordings produced by Ike Turner
Liberty Records singles
Songs against racism and xenophobia
Anti-war songs
Peace songs
Protest songs